The 2001 estyle.com Classic was a women's tennis tournament played on outdoor hard courts. It was part of the 2001 WTA Tour. It was the 28th edition of the tournament and took place in Manhattan Beach, California, United States, from August 6 through August 12, 2001. Second-seeded Lindsay Davenport won the singles title and earned $90,000 first-prize money.

Finals

Singles
 Lindsay Davenport defeated  Monica Seles, 6–3, 7–5
 It was Davenport's 4th singles title of the year and the 34th of her career.

Doubles
 Kimberly Po-Messerli /  Nathalie Tauziat defeated  Nicole Arendt /  Caroline Vis, 6–3, 7–5

External links
 ITF tournament edition details
 Tournament details

2001 WTA Tour
LA Women's Tennis Championships
2001 in sports in California
2001 in American tennis